This is a list of bottling companies. A bottling company is a commercial enterprise whose output is the bottling of beverages for distribution. A bottler is a company which mixes drink ingredients and fills up cans and bottles with the drink. The bottler then distributes the final product to wholesale sellers in a geographic area. Large companies like The Coca-Cola Company and Dannizota sell their product to bottlers such as the Coca-Cola Bottling Co., who then bottle and distribute it.

A
 A.J. Canfield Company
 The American Bottling Company
 Arizona Beverage Company
 A-Treat Bottling Company

B
 Boylan Bottling Company
 Brænne Mineralvatn
 Britvic
 Brooklyn Bottling Group

C

 Catawissa Bottling Company
 The Central America Bottling Corporation, Guatemala
 Coca-Cola bottlers
 Arca Continental
 Cameron Coca-Cola
Coca-Cola Andina
 Coca-Cola Amatil
 Coca-Cola Beverages Northeast
 Coca-Cola Bottlers Philippines, Inc.
 Coca-Cola Bottling Co. Consolidated
 Coca-Cola Bottling Company of Cape Cod
 Coca-Cola Bottling Company United Inc.
Coca-Cola Embonor 
 Coca-Cola European Partners
 Coca-Cola Hellenic
 Coca-Cola Içecek
 Coca-Cola Korea
 Dixie Coca-Cola Bottling Company Plant
 FEMSA
 Kirin Brewery Company
 Panamco
 Rome Coca-Cola Bottling (in the U.S. state of Georgia)
 San Miguel Corporation
 Shepparton Preserving Company
 Swire Group
 Cott

G
 Gosling Brothers
 Gladstone Springhouse and Bottling Plant

K
 Knox Glass Bottle Company

M
 Malvern water
 Monarch Beverage, Inc., of Indianapolis, Indiana
 Monarch Beverage Company, of Atlanta, Georgia
 Marches Bottling and Packaging, Herefordshire
 Magna Packaging, of Heathrow, London, UK 
 MenaBev, of Jeddah, Saudi Arabia

N
 National Beverage
 Natrona Bottling Company
 Nuno Tavares

P

 PepsiCo bottlers for Pepsi products

Ahmad Hamad Al Gosaibi & Brothers
 AmBev
 Baghdad Soft Drinks Co
 Brasserie Nationale d'Haiti
 Britvic
 Buffalo Rock
 PepsiAmericas
 Pepsi Philippines
 Pepsi-Cola Canada Beverages (West) Ltd.
 R.W.D.S.U., Local 558 v. Pepsi-Cola Canada Beverages (West) Ltd.
 Quilmes Industrial S.A.
 The Pepsi Bottling Group
 Varun Beverages
 Polar Beverages

R 
 Rauch

V 
 Varun Beverages

W
 Wet Planet Beverages
 White Rock Beverages

Z
 Zest-O Corporation

See also

 Anchor bottler
 Bottling line
 List of bottle types, brands and companies
 Packaging and labeling

References

Bottling companies
Bottling